Andrei Macovei (born 5 January 2000) is a Moldovan chess player who holds the title of International Master (IM, 2019). He won Moldovan Chess Championship (2019).

Biography 
Andrei Macovei was one of the best young Moldovan chess players. He participated in European Youth Chess Championships and World Youth Chess Championships. In 2017 Andrei Macovei won European School Chess Championship in Open U17 age group.

Andrei Macovei is a multiple participant of the Moldovan chess championships. In this tournaments he won gold (2019) and silver (2022) medals.

Andrei Macovei played for Moldova in the Chess Olympiad:
 In 2022, at second board in the 44th Chess Olympiad in Chennai (+4, =4, -2).

Andrei Macovei played for Moldova in the European Team Chess Championships:
 In 2017, at reserve board in the 21st European Team Chess Championship in Hersonissos (+2, =3, -2),
 In 2019, at second board in the 22nd European Team Chess Championship in Batumi (+2, =1, -3).

In 2019, he was awarded the FIDE International Master (IM) title.

References

External links 

2000 births
Living people
Chess International Masters
Moldovan chess players